Rodrigo Garcia (born 10 May 1974) is a Brazilian lawyer, businessman and politician, affiliated with the Brazilian Social Democracy Party (PSDB). He was state deputy elected for three consecutive legislatures, 1999–2002, 2003–2006 and 2007–2010, and president of the Legislative Assembly of São Paulo from 15 March 2005 to 15 March 2007. He had served as Governor of São Paulo from April to December 2022.

Career
Born in Tanabi, he left the position of deputy to head the Municipal Secretariat for Modernization, Management and Debureaucratization of the City Hall of São Paulo, from 2008 to 2010. In April 2010, he returned to the Legislative Assembly to continue his work as a state deputy for the Democrats. He was national vice president of DEM and secretary general of the party in the State of São Paulo.

In May 2011, he was invited by the governor of the State of São Paulo, Geraldo Alckmin, to assume the role of Secretary of State for Social Development.

On May 28, 2013, again by the invitation of Governor Geraldo Alckmin, he took over the role of Secretary of Economic Development, Science and Technology of the State of São Paulo, which later became the Secretary of Development of the State of São Paulo. On April 3, 2014, he left the command of the Secretariat to return to the Federal Chamber.

In the 2014 elections for the 55th legislature (2015-2019), Rodrigo was the fifth most voted federal deputy in the State of São Paulo, obtaining 336,151 votes. On February 1, 2015, he took up his fifth term. Afterwards, on March 19, 2015, he resigned from the position to assume the Secretary of State for Housing in the new government of Geraldo Alckmin. He voted in favor of impeaching Dilma Rousseff.

In the 2018 elections, he ran as vice governor on João Doria's ticket, for which he was elected in the second round.

As Secretary of Government, Rodrigo Garcia coordinates all the strategic actions of the state: vaccines, concessions, public investments, public-private partnerships and all the major management programs of the other secretariats.

References

External links
 
 
 

|-

|-

|-

|-

|-

1974 births
Living people
Members of the Legislative Assembly of São Paulo
Vice Governors of São Paulo (state)
Governors of São Paulo (state)
Brazilian Social Democracy Party politicians